The Soviet 160 mm Mortar M-160 is a smoothbore breech loading heavy mortar which fired a 160 mm bomb. It replaced the 160mm Mortar M1943 in Soviet service after World War II.

Description
It is very similar to the M1943 mortar but has a longer barrel, thus enabling a greater range. It is mounted on a wheeled carriage, in order to be towed by trucks such as the GAZ-66. China copied it as the Type 56 mortar.

According to the combat doctrine of the Vietnamese People's Army, the 160mm mortar was developed to destroy the enemy's fortified bunkers and trenches, and can also be used to ambush military bases. The mortar can be deployed in all terrains such as hills, urban areas or plains, etc. To be most effective, it is usually deployed in hilly and urban areas where the target is often hidden.

Service
It was introduced in 1953. Originally deployed as a standard mortar for all types of division, it is currently particularly used as mountain or urban artillery. Some countries still use it as field artillery. China originally deployed 12 Type 56 mortars per field division. The M-160 saw service during the Arab–Israeli conflict, including the Lebanese Civil War, with the Indian Army during the Indo-Pakistani War of 1971 and by North Vietnamese Army in 1975 spring offensive during Vietnam War

Users

 : 300
 
 
 : Type-56 variant.
 : 4 in store

Former users 

 
 
 
 
 

 : 100 locally-produced

References

External links 

160 mm mortars
Mortars of the Soviet Union
Military equipment introduced in the 1950s